Arthur Anne-Marie Thierry De Sloover (born 3 May 1997) is a Belgian field hockey player who plays as a defender for Dutch Hoofdklasse club Oranje-Rood and the Belgium national team.

Club career
De Sloover started playing hockey at the age of four. He played at Saint-Georges Hockey Club in Kortrijk from 2001 until 2014. He changed to Beerschot in the 2014–15 season. He was relegated with Beerschot in the 2021–22 season, after the relegation he joined Dutch side Oranje-Rood.

International career
He was part of the Belgian under-21 selection that placed second at the 2016 Junior World Championship in Lucknow, India. He was part of the Belgian selection that placed second at the 2017 European Championship in Amstelveen, the Netherlands. He was part of the Belgian selection that won the 2018 Hockey World Cup in Bhubaneswar, India. At the 2018 Hockey Stars Awards, he was named the FIH Rising Star of the Year. In August 2019, he was selected in the Belgium squad for the 2019 EuroHockey Championship. They won Belgium its first European title by defeating Spain 5-0 in the final. On 25 May 2021, he was selected in the squad for the 2021 EuroHockey Championship.

Honours
Belgium
 Olympic gold medal: 2020
 World Cup: 2018
 EuroHockey Championship: 2019
 FIH Pro League: 2020–21

Individual
FIH Rising Star of the Year: 2018

References

External links
 
 
 
 

1997 births
Living people
Sportspeople from Kortrijk
Belgian male field hockey players
Male field hockey defenders
Field hockey players at the 2020 Summer Olympics
Olympic field hockey players of Belgium
2018 Men's Hockey World Cup players
Men's Belgian Hockey League players
Royal Beerschot THC players
Olympic gold medalists for Belgium
Medalists at the 2020 Summer Olympics
Olympic medalists in field hockey
Men's Hoofdklasse Hockey players
HC Oranje-Rood players
2023 Men's FIH Hockey World Cup players
20th-century Belgian people
21st-century Belgian people